Emamode Edosio, popularly known as Ema, is a Nigerian filmmaker and film director. She obtained a Bachelor of Science (B.Sc.) in Computer science from Ogun State University. She studied digital film making at New York Film Academy (NYFA) and motion pictures at the Motion Pictures Institute of Michigan, United States. She received the best Film and Director of the year by sisterhood award.

In 2013, she returned to Nigeria. She worked with film production company like 66 Dimension is 2007. She later worked with Hip Hop TV, Clarence Peters at Capital Dreams Pictures, EbonyLife TV and as editor at BBC.  
Ema returned to school in Abuja to further study cinematography. She have produced many films like “Joy Ride”, “Ochuko” and directed Kasala.

Early life and education career

Edosio was born into a Christian home. She is the third child of the seven children in her family. Her father is a retired architect and her mother was a lawyer. She started her education at Loral Nursery and Primary School, Festac town, Lagos after which she proceeded to the Federal Government College, Odogbolu for a few years before concluding her secondary education at S-tee Private Academy, Festac Town.

She obtained a B.Sc. in computer science from Olabisi Onabanjo University, before she went to study digital film making at NYFA and motion pictures at the Motion Picture Institute of Michigan.

Professional career

She returned to Nigeria in 2013 after her education program in the US. In Nigeria, Ema worked with 66 Dimension, Hip Hop TV, Clarence Peters at Capital Dreams Pictures, Ebonylife TV and BBC. As a director, Ema has worked with notable artists like 2Baba, 9ice, Lord of Ajasa, Terry da Rapmanand and many others. Her first job at Ebonylife TV is called  "Heaven"

See also
 List of Nigerian film producers
 List of Nigerian cinematographers

References

Living people
Nigerian film directors
Nigerian cinematographers
Nigerian music video directors
Year of birth missing (living people)
Nigerian documentary filmmakers
Nigerian music industry executives
Olabisi Onabanjo University alumni
Federal Government College, Odogbolu alumni
New York Film Academy alumni
Nigerian women film directors
Nigerian film producers
Nigerian women film producers